Sayda is a town in the district of Mittelsachsen, in Saxony, Germany. It is situated 24 km south of Freiberg, and 28 km north of Chomutov.

Twin towns – sister cities
Sayda is twinned with:
 Sogliano al Rubicone, Italy
 Meziboří, Czech Republic

References 

Mittelsachsen